Julius Johansen (born 13 September 1999) is a Danish professional racing cyclist, who currently rides for UCI WorldTeam . He rode in the men's team pursuit event at the 2017 UCI Track Cycling World Championships and won gold at the 2017 UCI Road World Championships in the junior men's road race.

Major results

Track

2017
 UCI Junior Track World Championships
1st  Omnium
1st  Madison (with Mathias Alexander Larsen)
 UCI Track World Cup
1st  Team pursuit – Cali
2nd  Team pursuit – Pruszków
 2nd  Omnium, UEC European Track Championships
2018
 1st  Team pursuit – Saint-Quentin-en-Yvelines, UCI Track World Cup
 2nd  Team pursuit, UCI Track World Championships
2019
 1st  Team pursuit, UEC European Track Championships
 UCI Track World Cup
1st  Team pursuit – Glasgow
1st  Team pursuit – Minsk
 3rd  Team pursuit, UCI Track World Championships
2020
 1st  Team pursuit, UCI Track Championships

Road

2016
 1st Stage 1 Aubel–Thimister–La Gleize
2017
 1st  Road race, UCI Junior Road World Championships
 National Junior Road Championships
1st  Road race
1st  Time trial
 1st  Overall Trofeo Karlsberg
1st Stage 3b (ITT)
 2nd  Time trial, UEC European Junior Road Championships
2018
 1st  Road race, National Under-23 Road Championships
 1st  Overall Olympia's Tour
1st  Young rider classification
1st Stage 1
 5th Overall Danmark Rundt
1st  Young rider classification
2019
 2nd Overall Tour du Loir-et-Cher
1st  Young rider classification
2020
 National Under-23 Road Championships
1st  Road race
1st  Time trial
 8th Overall Tour Poitou-Charentes en Nouvelle-Aquitaine
2021
 3rd Time trial, National Under-23 Road Championships
 6th Paris–Tours Espoirs

Grand Tour general classification results timeline

References

External links

1999 births
Living people
Danish male cyclists
Danish track cyclists
UCI Track Cycling World Champions (men)
People from Allerød Municipality
Sportspeople from the Capital Region of Denmark
20th-century Danish people
21st-century Danish people